Nemertelline is a neurotoxic tetra-pyridine compound originally found in the marine hoplonemertine worm Amphiporus angulatus. These worms produce a variety of toxins which are used both in hunting their prey and in defending themselves from predators. Interest in potential application of this compound as an antifouling agent for boats and other marine installations has led to attempts to produce it synthetically by convenient routes. Its toxicity is similar to nicotine in crustaceans but has no mammalian toxicity. It is similar to nicotelline in structure.

References 

Pyridines
Neurotoxins